Summit Lake is a freshwater lake located in the northwest corner in the southwestern county, Thurston County. It is accessible through a Washington State Department of Fish and Wildlife owned boat launch at the southwestern side of the lake. Some of the fish found in this lake include rainbow trout, kokanee, largemouth bass, smallmouth bass, yellow perch, and coastal cutthroat. Summit Lake is a clean fresh water lake with a wide variety of fish. It is a popular lake to fish at in Thurston County and the South Puget Sound.

Early variant names were "Prays Lake" and "Crooked Lake"; the present name was adopted .

References

Lakes of Thurston County, Washington
Washington